Manuel Díaz Montava (born May 14, 1957, in Alicante) is a cyclist from Spain.  He has a disability: He is blind.  He competed at the 1996 Summer Paralympics, where he failed to medal. He competed at the 2000 Summer Paralympics. He finished first in the tandem road race.

References 

Spanish male cyclists
Living people
1957 births
Paralympic gold medalists for Spain
Cyclists at the 1996 Summer Paralympics
Cyclists at the 2000 Summer Paralympics
Sportspeople from Alicante
Paralympic medalists in cycling
Medalists at the 2000 Summer Paralympics
Paralympic cyclists of Spain
Cyclists from the Valencian Community